This is a list of casinos in Louisiana.

List of casinos

</onlyinclude>
</onlyinclude>

Slot Payback Percentages 

Slot payback percentages are acquired yearly from American Casino Guide Book. Louisiana state gaming laws require that casino machines must payback a minimum of 80% and a maximum of 99.9%.

Gallery

See also

List of casinos in the United States
List of casino hotels

References

External links

 
Casinos
Louisiana